is a former Japanese football player.

Playing career
Honda was born in Saitama Prefecture on May 20, 1981. When he was a Senshu University student, he joined the J2 League club Ventforet Kofu in 2003. On May 17, he debuted as substitute midfielder from the 88th minutes against Mito HollyHock. On August 3, he played as a substitute midfielder from the 85th minute against Kawasaki Frontale. However he could only play these two matches and left the club at the end of the 2003 season.

Club statistics

References

External links

1981 births
Living people
Senshu University alumni
Association football people from Saitama Prefecture
Japanese footballers
J2 League players
Ventforet Kofu players
Association football midfielders